Múli (pronounced) is a hamlet on the Island of Borðoy in the Norðoyar Region of the Faroes.

Múli lies on the outermost northern edge of Borðoy's east coast. The origins of the settlement can be traced back to the 14th century. Múli became the last community in the archipelago to receive electricity in 1970. It was later connected with Norðdepil by Road 743 in an attempt to stop depopulation. Nevertheless, Múli has been considered abandoned since 2002, though there are still four registered residents. During the summer months, some of its former residents use their old houses as vacation homes.

Nature 
The mountains around Múli are spectacular and do not offer any easy climbing. They are also the last stronghold of a contiguous population of Arctic Willow in the Faroe Islands.

History 
The oldest record of Múli is to be found in the so-called ‘Hundabrævið’, the Dog letter, a letter concerning the keeping of sheep dogs in the Faroe Islands in the 14th century.

One of the most famous wizards in the Faroe Islands is said to have been Guttorm í Múla (1657-1739). A resident of Múli, he was reputedly often asked by people around the islands for help using his supernatural powers.

The Open Air Museum of the National Museum of Denmark, north of Copenhagen, holds two old houses from Múli, which were taken apart in the Faroes and then rebuilt on site at the museum.  The old hav lifting stone of Múli is also at the same museum.

Gallery

See also
 List of towns in the Faroe Islands

References

External links

Danish site with photographs of Múla
Old photographs from Múla

Populated places in the Faroe Islands